Kate and Jol Temple are internationally awarded children's authors.  They are the 2020 winners of the Charlotte Huck Award for their book Room on Our Rock.  They are also widely known for their 2017 Children's Book Council of Australia Honour Book Captain Jimmy Cook Discovers Third Grade, published by Allen and Unwin. The book was praised for its use of humour and history.

Their picture book, I Got This Hat, was the 2016 National Simultaneous Storytime book and read by more than half a million children on the same day at the same time. The book is published by HarperCollins.  The book has also been produced as an app with funding from the Australia Council for the Arts.

Books written and published

Picture Books
 Parrot Carrot (2012)
 I Got This Hat (2014)
 Mike I Don't Like (2015)
 Room On Our Rock (2018)
 Are You My Bottom (2018)
 Bin Chicken (2020)
 Move That Mountain (2020)
 Winner Winner Bin Chicken Dinner (2021)
 Bin Chicken Flies Again (2022)

Children's Novels
 Captain Jimmy Cook Discovers Third Grade (2016)
 Captain Jimmy Cook Discovers X Marks The Spot (2017)
 Yours Troolie, Alice Toolie (2018)
 Birthday Wars (2019)
 Battle of Bookweek (2020)
 The Underdogs, Catch a Cat Burglar (2021)
 The Underdogs, Fake it 'Till they Make It (2021)
 The Underdogs, Hit a Grand Slam (2022)

References

External links 
 
National Library of Australia record
I Got This Hat at Austlit (subscription required)

Australian children's writers
Living people
Writing duos
Year of birth missing (living people)